The Estonian Coach of the Year is chosen annually each December, since 1988. The winner is voted by a group of sports journalists, public, and sports associations. Skiing coach Mati Alaver has won the award a record five times.

List of award winners

See also
 Estonian Sports Personality of the Year
 Estonian Young Sports Personality of the Year
 Estonian Sports Team of the Year

External links
 Official website

Estonian sports trophies and awards
Estonian Coach of the Year
Awards established in 1988
1988 establishments in Estonia